Arisnoidys Despaigne is a Cuban boxer who competes in the welterweight division. In the 2013 AIBA World Boxing Championships he reached the finals.

References

Living people
1986 births
Place of birth missing (living people)
Cuban male boxers
AIBA World Boxing Championships medalists
Welterweight boxers
21st-century Cuban people